Nadergul is a part of Bandangpet Nagar Panchayath in Rangareddy district of Telangana state, India.  It hosts Nadergul Airfield.

The jurisdiction of Hyderabad Airport Development Authority (HADA) is about 458 km2 and covers 70 Revenue villages and 19 hamlets all falling in Ranga Reddy District, in this Nadergul village also included.

Village population 
Total males:-12947
Total females:-11914
Total:-24861

Assembly Constituency
 Maheswaram and Kandukur Mandals, Saroornagar Mandal (Part), Medbowli, Almasguda, Badangpet, Chintalakunta, Jalpally, Mamidipally, Kurmalguda and Nadargul (Rural) Mandals. Hyderabad (OG) (Part). Balapur (OG) - Ward No.36, Kothapet (OG) - Ward No.37, Venkatapur (OG) - Ward No.39, Mallapur (OG) - Ward No.40, Lal Bahadur Nagar (M+OG) (Part), Lal Bahadur Nagar (M) - Ward No.11, Nadargul (OG) (Part) - Ward No.12, Jillelguda (OG) - Ward No.15, Meerpet (CT).

Colleges 
MRR College of Pharmacy
MVSR Engineering College
Spoorthy Engineering College
Noble PG College of MBA
Noble College of Engineering Technology for Women (NETW)
Einstein Institute of Teacher Training, Nadergul
Einstein College of Education, Nadergul
Einstein PG College, Nadergul
bhavani decorators nadergul
vishwa bharathi  College of Engineering&sciences {VBTS}

Transport
203 - Woman's college - Nadergul
203l/d - Dilsukhnagar - Nadergul
102B/203 - Nadergul -Secunderabad
203A - Women's college Koti - Nadergul

References

External links 
Map
Google search results for Nadergul

Villages in Ranga Reddy district